Sean Bankhead is an American dancer and choreographer. He served as a judge on the American music competition series Becoming A Popstar.

Bankhead has created the choreography for many music videos, including Lil Nas X's "Industry Baby"(featuring Jack Harlow), Normani's "Motivation" and "Wild Side"(featuring Cardi B), Cardi B's "Up", Sam Smith's "Dancing with a Stranger" (with Normani) and "I'm Ready" (with Demi Lovato), and FKA Twigs' "Tears in the Club" (featuring The Weeknd).

He has also choreographed concert tours, and television and film productions. Throughout his career, he has earned five nominations for the MTV Video Music Award for Best Choreography.

Early life
Born in Philadelphia, Pennsylvania. He moved to Atlanta, Georgia, United States; and began his career by uploading a dance video to YouTube in 2006 on his original channel "Seanalator". The video went viral and amassed over 1.5 million views. In 2007, Bankhead landed his first high-profile gig, appearing as a love interest in the music video for "Promise Ring" by Tiffany Evans. The following year, he was hired as a dancer for Beyoncé, performing with the singer during a live performance of "Single Ladies (Put a Ring on It)" on The Tyra Banks Show.

Career

Music videos and live performances 
In 2014, Bankhead choreographed the music video for Fifth Harmony's "Boss", and later on their music video for "Down", which earned him a MTV Video Music Award nomination; since then he has developed a close working relationship with former Fifth Harmony member Normani, referring to her as his muse, and choreographing her music videos for "Motivation", "Dancing with a Stranger"(with Sam Smith), and "Wild Side"(featuring Cardi B). He has also frequently collaborated with Missy Elliott, working with her on the music video for her single "I'm Better", and her Michael Jackson Video Vanguard Award medley at the 2019 MTV Video Music Awards.

Bankhead has also choreographed, directed, and performed many music videos and performances, such as Cardi B's "Up" and her live performance of "WAP" (with Megan Thee Stallion) at the 63rd Annual Grammy Awards, Megan Thee Stallion's "Her", Sam Smith & Demi Lovato's "I'm Ready", Saweetie's "Best Friend"(featuring Doja Cat), Lil Nas X's "Industry Baby"(featuring Jack Harlow), and their live performance of "Montero (Call Me by Your Name)" on SNL, City Girls' "Twerkulator", Alesso's "When I'm Gone", (with Katy Perry), and "Tears in the Club" by FKA Twigs (featuring The Weeknd). He has also worked for Britney Spears Saucy Santana (with Latto), and Drake.

Additional choreographed work 
Bankhead has choreographed for various television shows, including the Lee Daniels drama series Empire, and the Lena Waithe BET series Boomerang. He choreographed all of the dance performances for the Fox musical drama Star. Bankhead was credited for choreographing a dance routine for Will Ferrell in the movie Anchorman 2: The Legend Continues. In 2013, he served as the assistant choreographer for Beyoncé's The Mrs. Carter Show World Tour.

In 2020, Bankhead choreographed the Pepsi Zero Sugar Super Bowl LIV commercial featuring Missy Elliott and H.E.R. The following year, he worked with Pepsi again, choreographing a commercial featuring Doja Cat. In 2022, Bankhead joined Joe Jonas and Becky G to serve as a judges on the MTV & TikTok American music competition series Becoming A Popstar.

Personal life
Bankhead is openly gay.

He stated in interview with Yahoo! Life that he is close friends with music choreographer JaQuel Knight.

Awards
In 2021, Bankhead was placed on the 'Performers of the Year' section of the Out100 list by Out magazine, which is an annual list described as a "prestigious compilation of the year's most impactful and influential LGBTQ+ people".

Notes

References

American choreographers
American LGBT entertainers
LGBT people from Pennsylvania
Gay dancers
Living people
Year of birth missing (living people)
People from Philadelphia
21st-century American LGBT people